Longdendale High School (formerly Longdendale Community Language College) is a coeducational secondary school located in Hollingworth, Greater Manchester, England. The school's Headteacher is Andrea Jones.

Previously a community school administered by Tameside Metropolitan Borough Council, in July 2017 Longdendale High School converted to academy status. From then the school was sponsored by the AspirePlus Educational Trust, however in January 2021 the school transferred to the Stamford Park Trust.

Ofsted
In 2010 Ofsted inspected the school's MFL department. Teaching and learning in the department was judged to be satisfactory.

References

Secondary schools in Tameside
Educational institutions established in 2017
Academies in Tameside
2017 establishments in England